is the opening theme song of the Dragon Ball anime series and is the 1st single by singer Hiroki Takahashi. Originally released on vinyl and cassette on March 1, 1986, it was re-released on 8 cm cd on March 21, 1998. It is coupled with the Dragon Ball closing theme  performed by Ushio Hashimoto.

Track listing 
All music composed by Takeshi Ike, and all tracks arranged by Kohei Tanaka.

Cover versions 
In 1989, Harmony Gold created their own version of the song for their short-lived English dub of Dragon Ball, using the original Japanese music. It features an unknown singer. The lyrics are credited to Kathryn Nelligan.

The Creative Products Corporation also created an English version, used for their dub in the Philippines. The song was made by a short-lived singing and dancing group of children/teenagers named Age of Wonder, led by Gino Padilla. The full song was released onto a limited CD called Dragon Ball • Dragon Ball Z: Songs of a High Spirited Saga - Volume 1 in 1996.

Funimation Entertainment also recorded the opening and closing themes, sung in English for their dub. "Mystical Adventure!" was sung by Jimi Tunnell and "Romantic Ageru yo" by Daphne Gere. Though the lyrics were not a literal translation of the original Japanese, they were still somewhat faithful.

In 1998, the group Animetal recorded a heavy metal cover of "Makafushigi Adventure!" for their album This is Japanimetal Marathon. The Animetal tribute band Animetal USA covered the song in English on their 2011 self-titled debut album.

Shoko Nakagawa covered "Romantic Ageru yo" for her 2007 anison cover album Shokotan☆Kaba ~ Anison ni Koi o Shite.

Kazuya Yoshii included a cover of "Romantic Ageru yo", that features his The Yellow Monkey bandmate Hideaki Kikuchi on guitar, on his 2015 single "Chōzetsu☆Dynamic!".

2005 version 

In 2005 Takahashi was called back to record a self-cover of "Makafushigi Adventure!". A self-cover version, featuring Takahashi on the cover, was also released on the same day. It is available in North America through iTunes.

Track listing 
"Makafushigi Adventure! (2005 ver.)"
"Mezase Tenka-ichi (2005 ver.)"
"Dragon Ball Densetsu (2005 ver.)"
"Aoki Tabibito-tachi (2005 ver.)"
"Makafushigi Adventure! (DJ Dr. Knob Remix)"
"Makafushigi Adventure! (2005 ver. instrumental)"
"Mezame Tenkaichi (2005 ver. instrumental)"
"Dragon Ball Densetsu (2005 ver. instrumental)"
"Aoki Tabibito-tachi (2005 ver. instrumental)"

References

External links 
Yahoo Music page 1998 reissue
Team Entertainment page 2005 version

1986 singles
1998 singles
2005 singles
Dragon Ball songs
Columbia Records singles
1986 songs